The 2008 Miami Valley Silverbacks season was the third season for the Continental Indoor Football League (CIFL) franchise. In 2008, the team saw the only coach it had even known, removed himself from the position and become the team's president. His first move was to hire Carl Allen as his successor. The team finished 3-9 and had their third season in a row of declining win totals.

Schedule

2008 standings

References

2008 Continental Indoor Football League season
Dayton Sharks
Miami Valley Silverbacks